Julian Perry (born 19 January 1960 in Worcester, England) is a London-based British artist.

Career 
Perry studied at Maidenhead School of Art and Design from 1977 to 1980, and Bristol Polytechnic from 1978 to 1981. After graduating, Perry moved to East London, and began painting the area around his home in Leyton. He established a reputation for romantic urban realism.

In 1998, Perry was invited by Bristol City Art Gallery to create a work depicting the tower blocks at Hartcliffe. Perry’s work then shifted to the wider landscape of Brownfield sites and nature reserves. In 2003, he produced a show for London's Guildhall Art Gallery on the theme of Epping Forest. This was followed in 2007 with a series depicting local allotment sheds destroyed in preparation for the London 2012 Olympic Site.  

Perry's paintings of specific locations and natural phenomenon, often ones under environmental threat or affected by human interventions, explore the tenuous relationships between people and nature.
Since 2012, coastal erosion and the impact of climate change have dominated Perry’s work. These themes took center stage in works Perry exhibited in 2015 at the Venice Biennale, and in 2022 at the Southampton City Art Gallery.

Perry’s paintings are held in several public collections, including the Bristol City Museum and Art Gallery, London Transport Museum, Middlesbrough Institute of Modern Art, The Museum of London, the London Guildhall Collection, and the personal collection of King Charles III.

Selected exhibitions

2007: Julian Perry. Austin Desmond Fine Art

2014: Arboretum: Royal West of England Academy.

Selected works

References

External Links 
Official Website

1960 births
Artists from Worcester, England
British landscape painters
Living people